Dr. Saman Barzanji is the Health Minister of the Kurdistan Regional Government in Iraq.

Prior to his appointment as KRG health minister, Barzanji was the head of Erbil municipality's health department. Barzanji helped to respond to the public health problems caused by the conflict with ISIS.

Barzanji has been one of the main public officials responsible for responding to the Coronavirus disease outbreak in the Kurdistan Region of Iraq. He has given frequent updates on the spread of the virus at press conferences.

References 

Kurdish politicians
Salahaddin University-Erbil alumni
Health ministers of Iraq
Year of birth missing (living people)
Living people